Khuramabad is a hamlet located on the east side of Passu valley in Gojal, Hunza in Pakistan. It is used for pasture in winter. It is on the other side of the Hunza river from Passu village. There is no vehicle access, only a long pedestrian suspension bridge crossing. Many tourist come to see the bridge. Above the Khuramabad there is a very beautiful viewpoint called Abdegar, from this place you can see many colorful mountains around Passu and Batura valley

Populated places in Hunza District